Amrudak may refer to:

Amrudak, Qazvin
Amrudak, Razavi Khorasan